is a station located in Suita, Osaka Prefecture, Japan.

Lines
Hankyu Senri Line

Stations next to Minami-Senri

|-
!colspan=5|Hankyu Railway

History
August 29, 1963 - Shin-Senriyama was opened as the northern terminus of the Senri Line.
March 1, 1967 - The Senri Line was extended to Kita-Senri Station. At the opening of that station, Shin-Senriyama was renamed Minami-Senri.

References

External links
 Minami-Senri Station from Hankyu Railway website

Railway stations in Osaka Prefecture